James T. Clark (born February 21, 1963) is an American politician in the state of Minnesota. He served in the Minnesota House of Representatives.

References

Republican Party members of the Minnesota House of Representatives
1963 births
Living people
People from Scarsdale, New York
People from Springfield, Minnesota
Iona University alumni
Western Michigan University Cooley Law School alumni
Minnesota lawyers